San Bruno station is a Bay Area Rapid Transit (BART) station located adjacent to the Tanforan shopping center in San Bruno, California in northern San Mateo County. It consists of two main tracks and a shared underground island platform. Service at the station began on June 22, 2003 as part of the BART San Mateo County Extension project that extended BART service southward from Colma to Millbrae and San Francisco International Airport.

History 
The land for the station was acquired from the neighboring shopping center through eminent domain proceedings that started in 1999; after the two-year lawsuit, BART paid $34 million as a settlement in 2001 to the four corporations who jointly owned the mall property. The City of San Bruno requested the new station be named Tanforan Park after the racetrack and later mall that occupied the site, but BART officials, sensitive to the past history of Tanforan as an Assembly Center for Japanese-American citizens during World War II and the recent lawsuit, declined the request in 2002.

During daytime hours on weekdays starting in 2008 the station served as a cross-platform transfer station for passengers traveling between Millbrae station to the south and San Francisco International Airport station to the east. A direct service was partially restored the following year, with the transfer rendered unnecessary at all times effective February 11, 2019, though it appeared as a transfer station on BART maps until 2021.

The Tanforan Assembly Center Memorial Committee (TACMC) has raised funds and begun construction of the Tanforan Memorial at the San Bruno BART station. TACMC was formed in March 2012 to commemorate the 70th anniversary of the Tanforan Assembly Center by staging an exhibition of photographs by Dorothea Lange and Paul Kitagaki Jr. covering the Internment of Japanese Americans following the issuance of Executive Order 9066. The Tanforan Assembly Center was named after the racetrack where more than 8,000 Japanese-Americans, primarily from the San Francisco Bay Area, were temporarily detained before being sent to more permanent War Relocation Centers; the station now stands where the racetrack was. When complete, the new memorial will include a bronze statue depicting Hiroko and Miyuki Mochida of Hayward, inspired by one of Lange's photographs from 1942. A groundbreaking ceremony for the new memorial was held on February 11, 2022. Within the station, photographs from Lange and Kitagaki will remain on permanent display.

Bus connections 
SamTrans bus routes 140, 141, 398, and ECR stop at bus bays on the ground level of the parking garage north of the station.

References

External links 

BART – San Bruno

Stations on the Yellow Line (BART)
Stations on the Red Line (BART)
Bay Area Rapid Transit stations in San Mateo County, California
San Bruno, California
Railway stations in the United States opened in 2003
2003 establishments in California
Bus stations in San Mateo County, California